Johannes Lehtman (20 December 1886 Nehatu Parish (now Jõelähtme Parish), Kreis Harrien – 7 February 1953 Stockholm) was an Estonian politician. He was a member of the Estonian Constituent Assembly, representing the Estonian Labour Party and of the III and IV Riigikogu, representing the Settlers' Party. On 6 October 1919, he resigned his seat in the Constituent Assembly and was replaced by Jakob Sõnajalg.

References

1886 births
1953 deaths
People from Jõelähtme Parish
People from Kreis Harrien
Estonian Labour Party politicians
Settlers' Party politicians
Members of the Estonian Constituent Assembly
Members of the Riigikogu, 1926–1929
Members of the Riigikogu, 1929–1932
Estonian World War II refugees
Estonian emigrants to Sweden